Baron Darwen, of Heys-in-Bowland in the West Riding of the County of York, is a title in the Peerage of the United Kingdom. It was created on 12 February 1946 for John Davies, a prominent cotton manufacturer. He served as a Lord-in-waiting (government whip in the House of Lords) from 1949 to 1950 in the Labour administration of Clement Attlee.  the title is held by his great-grandson, the fourth Baron, who succeeded his father in 2011.

Barons Darwen (1946)
John Percival Davies, 1st Baron Darwen (1885–1950)
Cedric Percival Davies, 2nd Baron Darwen (1915–1988)
Roger Michael Davies, 3rd Baron Darwen (1938–2011)
Paul Davies, 4th Baron Darwen (b. 1962)

The heir apparent is the present holder's elder son, Hon. Oscar Kamen Davies (b. 1996)

References

Kidd, Charles, Williamson, David (editors). Debrett's Peerage and Baronetage (1990 edition). New York: St Martin's Press, 1990.

Baronies in the Peerage of the United Kingdom
Noble titles created in 1946